Sat Thai (also spelled Sart Thai) is a traditional Thai mid-year festival, held on the new moon at the end of the tenth lunar month. It has many features of animism, attributing souls or spirits to animals, plants and other entities.

Etymology 
It specifically refers to the season "when the grain is in the ear": rice grain panicles droop as seeds reach full size and fills with milky starch in the days before harvest time. Fruits also are in the bud. Sat Thai is known as such to differentiate it from the Ghost Festival, known in Thai as Sat Chin.

Observance
Sat Thai Day occurs at the end of Thai lunar calendar Moon 10, that is, waning day 15, evening. This is a New Moon and so is a Buddhist Sabbath; but not one of the Special Sabbaths, and not one of the secular public holidays in Thailand. It occurs midway past the traditional Thai New Year and near the autumnal equinox. It an occasion for making merit by honoring ( buucha) the spirits of the season, as well as one's deceased relatives, according to local tradition, with various rites and ceremonies.

Beginning of the Vegetarian Festival 

Sat Thai Day usually corresponds with the beginning of the nine-day Vegetarian Festival, which is widely observed by Thai Chinese and some Thais. It appears on calendars as "Begin 9-day vegetarian festival" (roem thet-sa-gan kin-che 9 wan) — kin-che is to vow in the manner of Vietnamese or Chinese Buddhists to eat a strict vegetarian diet.

See also 
 Mid-Autumn Festival
 Lughnasadh, a Celtic festival with many similar traditions
 Sat Duan Sip

References 

Buddhist festivals in Thailand
October observances
Observances set by the Thai lunar calendar